Sarasa Venkatanarayana Bhatti is an Indian judge who is presently serving as a judge of Kerala High Court. The High Court of Kerala is the highest court in the Indian state of Kerala and in the Union Territory of Lakshadweep. The High Court of Kerala is headquartered at Ernakulam, Kochi.

Early life and education
Bhatti was born to Ramakrishnaiah and Annapurnamma at Madanapalle, Chittoor, Andhra Pradesh. He attended Giri Rao Theosophical High School, Madanapalle for primary education, Graduated in Commerce from Beasant Theosophical College, Madanapalle and obtained degree in law from Jagadguru Renukacharya College, Bengaluru.

Career
Bhatti enrolled as an advocate on 21.01.1987 and started practicing in Andhra Pradesh High Court at Hyderabad. During his practice, he served as standing counsel for Hindustan Shipyard, Andhra Pradesh Pollution Control Board, Indian Maritime University, Bharat Heavy Electricals Limited, Bharat Electronics, BHPV, RSVP etc. and also served as Special Government Pleader during 2000–2003. On 12.04.2013 he was elevated as Additional Judge of High Court of Andhra Pradesh and served as judge of High Court of Judicature at Hyderabad for the State of Telangana and Andhra Pradesh until bifurcation and establishment of High Court of Andra Pradesh at Amaravathi on 01.06.2014 and continued to serve at Amaravathi till 18.03.2019 and upon transfer, from 19.03.2019 he is serving as permanent judge of Kerala High court and Chairman of Kerala High Court Legal Services Committee.

References

External links
 High Court of Kerala

Living people
1962 births
Judges of the Kerala High Court
20th-century Indian judges